"Saint or Sinner" is the second official single by Aggro Santos, released on 22 August 2010. The single has been taken from Santos' debut album, AggroSantos.com. It reached number 19 on the UK Singles Chart.

Critical reception
Fraser McAlpine of BBC Chart Blog wrote dismissively of the song, saying that Santos was turning into "Pitbull Junior" with the song's shallow focus on girls. .

Music video
The music video was shot entirely at a party in London. Santos had a competition on his website with appearance in the video as a prize.

Chart performance

Release history

References

2010 singles
Mercury Records singles
2010 songs
Songs written by Viktoria Hansen